Calytrix uncinata is a species of plant in the myrtle family Myrtaceae that is endemic to Western Australia.

It usually blooms between August and November producing white star-shaped flowers.

Found on granite or sandstone breakaways, rocky rises in the central Mid West region of Western Australia where it grows on sandy clay soils.
 
The species was first formally described by Lyndley Craven in 1990 in the article Three additional species in Calytrix (including the reduction of Calythropsis), and notes on Calytrix exstipulata (Myrtaceae). in the journal Australian Systematic Botany.

References

Plants described in 1990
uncinata
Flora of Western Australia